Kilseily is a civil parish in County Clare, Ireland. The main settlement is the village of Broadford.

Location

Kilseily lies in the barony of Tulla Lower, County Clare.
As of 1837 it had  as applotted under the tithe act.
Some of the land was suitable for cultivation while the rest was mountain pasture or bog.
The parish had slate quarries.
Lough Doon is on the northwest boundary.
The parish contains the town of Broadford.
In 1841 it had 4,153 people in 662 houses.

History

Clonlea, Kilseily and part of O'Brien's Bridge (Trúgh) used to comprise the district of Ui Floinn, the land of the O'Flynns. This sept is little known, but there is a mention in MacGrath's Wars of Thormond of the battle of Magh Duine around 953 in which Lachtna, uncle of Brian Boroimhe, slew three of the O'Flynns.
Part of Killokennedy was amalgamated with Kilseily to form what is now the parish of Broadford in the Roman Catholic Diocese of Killaloe.

Townlands

Townlands are Ahaclare,  Ardskeagh,  Ballykelly,  Cloonsheerea,  Cloontra,  Cloontra East,  Cloontra West,  Coolagh,  Crag,  Derryvinnaan,  Derry,  Doon,  Drummin,  Drumminakela,  Drumsillagh or Sallybank (Merritt),  Drumsillagh or Sallybank (Parker),  Gortacullin,  Gortnaglogh,  Gortnagonnella,  Hurdleston,  Killaderry (Massy),  Killaderry (O'Brien),  Kilmoculla,  Kilseily,  Knockshanvo,  Kyle,  Meanagh,  Mountrice,  O'Shea's Acres,  Snaty (Cooper),  Snaty (Massy),  Snaty (Wilson),  Violethill and  Woodfield.

References

Sources

 

Civil parishes of County Clare